The church was founded by the World Harvest Mission in 1986, working with Ugandan Christian. The first congregation located in Fort Portal in 1986, and the second congregation in 1992 in Bundibugyo. The church reports growing church planting across western Uganda and the Congolese border. It gas 2 congregations and 25 house fellowships with 1,000 members in 2004. The Westminster Confession of Faith and the Apostles Creed are the official confessions. Official languages are Rutooro, Lubhwisi and Rukonjo.

The church has partnership relations with a PCA church in North Carolina.

External links 
Website of New Life

References 

Presbyterian denominations in Africa
Presbyterianism in Uganda